La Pedrera is a parish of the municipality of Gijón / Xixón, in Asturias, Spain.

Its population was 660 in 2003 and 761 in 2012.

La pedrera borders the district of Ruedes in the south, Leorio / Llorio in the east and L'Abadía Cenero in the west.

Villages and their neighbourhoods
Arroyo
La Cotariella
Fontaciera
Bilorteo
El Picón
Mareo de Riba
La Pedrera
La Campa
La Casa los Cadaviecos
La Fundigada
La Iglesia
La Iría
Llareo
La Llosica
La Quinta los Condes

External links
 Official Toponyms - Principality of Asturias website.
 Official Toponyms: Laws - BOPA Nº 229 - Martes, 3 de octubre de 2006 & DECRETO 105/2006, de 20 de septiembre, por el que se determinan los topónimos oficiales del concejo de Gijón.

Parishes in Gijón